The Home Office Scientific Development Branch - HOSDB (Formally: Police Scientific Development Branch) was a Branch of the Home Office in the United Kingdom which provided Scientific research into new technology that could be used to fight crime.

History
HOSDB supports the Home Office's strategic aims through the effective application of science and technology. HOSDB also provides technical support for the UK police service and Security Services. HOSDB has two sites in the UK, Sandridge, Hertfordshire and Langhurst, West Sussex. The work of the HOSDB involved hi-tech research into countering terrorism, technology to fight crime, securing our borders and reducing crime and anti-social behaviour.(Sandridge Council Minutes) Their work sometimes involved attending incidents such as the explosions in London in 2006 in order to assess structural impacts, etc. There are 250 staff — 200 scientists and engineers and 50 support staff, half of whom live in and around Sandridge, making them a large local employer.

References

External links
 Police Scientific Development Branch
 Home Office Scientific Development Branch

Science and technology in the United Kingdom
Defunct executive agencies of the United Kingdom government
Forensic government agencies
Law enforcement in England and Wales
Home Office (United Kingdom)
Government agencies established in 1991
1991 establishments in the United Kingdom